Lakshmi Narasimha Temple is situated in temple town named Antarvedi of Sakhinetipalle Mandal, located in the Konaseema district of the Andhra Pradesh state in India. The temple is situated at the place where the Bay of Bengal and Vashista Godavari, a tributary of the Godavari River, meet. It was built in the 15th and 16th centuries.

Travel

There are three ways that one can travel to Antarvedi. Steam launches are available. Alternatively, one can ride on the ferry, upon reaching Sakhinetipalli and from there start for Antarvedi by road. The third option is to cross the Chinchinada using the newly built bridge, and travel the rest of the way by road.

Festivals
Kalyanamohasthavam from Magha Sudha Sapthami to Magha Bahula Padyami, Sri Venkateswara Swamy kalyanam during Jesta Sudha Ekadasi and Sri Narasimha Jayanthi during Vaisakha Sudha Chaturdasi are prominent festivals celebrated in the temple.

References

External links 
Lakshmi Narasimha Temple website
East godavari district website

Hindu temples in East Godavari district
Narasimha temples